Las Peñas de Riglos is a municipality located in the Hoya de Huesca comarca, province of Huesca, in Aragon, Spain. It is formed by the merger of several towns and whose capital city is Riglos. According to the 2004 census (INE), the municipality has a population of 282 inhabitants.

Natural sites
Mallos de Riglos
Protected landscape of San Juan de la Peña and Monte Oroel

Images of the town of Riglos

Towns within the municipality

A Penya
Carcavilla
Centenero
Ena
Fanyanars
Rasal
Riglos
Salinas de Chaca
Santa María d'a Penya
Triste
Villalangua
Yeste

References

Municipalities in the Province of Huesca